Crescent City Christmas Card is an album by jazz trumpeter Wynton Marsalis that was released in 1989. The album reached a peak position of number fourteen on Billboard Top Jazz Albums chart.

Track listing

Personnel

 Wynton Marsalis – trumpet, narrator, arranger
 Kathleen Battle – vocals
 Jon Hendricks – vocals
 Wessell Anderson – alto saxophone
 Todd Williams – clarinet, soprano, saxophone, tenor saxophone
 Alvin Batiste – clarinet
 Joe Temperley – bass clarinet, baritone saxophone
 Wycliffe Gordon – trombone
 Marcus Roberts – piano
 Reginald Veal – bass
 Ben Riley – drums
 Herlin Riley – drums
Technical
 Steven Epstein – producer
 George Butler – executive producer, producer
 Dennis Ferrante – engineer
 Tim Geelan – engineer
 Stanley Crouch – liner notes

Credits adapted from AllMusic.

References

1989 Christmas albums
Albums produced by George Butler (record producer)
Christmas albums by American artists
Columbia Records Christmas albums
Jazz Christmas albums
Wynton Marsalis albums